The Colonel George H. Paddock House is a historic house at 906 South Main Street in Princeton, Illinois. Built in 1903, the house was designed with elements of the Queen Anne and Neoclassical styles. As is typical of Queen Anne buildings, the house has an asymmetrical shape with a complex cross-gabled roof. The front of the house features a wraparound porch supported by Doric columns. The house's windows include both stained glass windows and projecting bay windows typical of the Queen Anne style and pedimented triple windows typical of Neoclassical architecture.

The house was added to the National Register of Historic Places on December 17, 2021.

References

Houses on the National Register of Historic Places in Illinois
National Register of Historic Places in Bureau County, Illinois
Houses completed in 1903
Queen Anne architecture in Illinois
Neoclassical architecture in Illinois
Princeton, Illinois